Babaghuq was the title of an elected chieftain who was involved in the governance of a Khazar town, either in place of or in conjunction with a tudun or governor. The name means "father of the city".

Babaghuqs are recorded as being involved in city politics in Cherson and Tamatarkha.

References
Kevin Alan Brook. The Jews of Khazaria. 2nd ed. Rowman & Littlefield Publishers, Inc, 2006.
Omeljan Pritsak. "The Khazar Kingdom's Conversion to Judaism." Harvard Ukrainian Studies 3:2 (Sept. 1978): 278-279.

Khazar titles